Félix Anaut (born Zaragoza, 1944) is a Spanish painter whose work is based in Abstract Expressionism and figurative monumentalism.

Education and background
Felix Anaut studied at the École de Montparnasse d’art et dessin in Paris in 1978–79, and has lived in Madrid, Tangier, Ibiza, London, Belfast. In 1986 he became a member of the Association of Irish Artists.  He currently lives in South West France.

In 2005 Felix Anaut was listed by the Spanish national newspaper, El Mundo, in their annual year review as one of the most influential personalities in the Arts, 2005–2006.

Exhibitions
He has exhibited widely since 1978 and has had many solo and group shows internationally in institutions, galleries and art fairs.

Notable recent events have included exhibitions at the Contemporary Art Centre CAM in Mont-de-Marsan France; The James Wray Gallery, Belfast, Northern Ireland, UK; The Barnard Gallery, Cape Town; The Zimmer Stewart Gallery, England, UK; BBK (Bilbao Bizkaia Kutxa) Foundation, Bilbao; Caja Rural de Aragon Foundation, Zaragoza.

Collections
Felix Anaut's work is held in numerous private and public collections worldwide, including The British Museum London; Casoria Contemporary Art Museum, Naples; The Ulster Museum, Northern Ireland; Instituto Cervantes (Dublin & Bordeaux); BBK (Bilbao Bizkaia Kutxa) Foundation, Bilbao; Caja Rural de Aragon Foundation, Zaragoza; Marzelles Museum, France; The Simonow Collection, France.

In 2010 a comprehensive book, Felix Anaut, his life and work was published with text by the European art collector and author of several artists monographs, Michael Simonow. The book covers the artist's life to date, with accompanying photographs, approximately 120 colour plates of the artists work.

Visual music
A current theme of Anaut's work is his inspiration from Baroque music, interpreted by him onto canvas.

Following his "London Symphony" exhibited in 2010 with Zimmer Stewart Gallery, Felix Anaut presented his "Zaragoza Visual Symphony" an exhibition of large paintings accompanied by music written by Gonzalo Alonso specifically for this event, in Zaragoza in May 2011. The piece includes an aria written by Felix Anaut and which was sung by the international soprano Marta Almajano. The whole project was  accompanied by a catalogue, CD recording and video. With a very innovative installation, the project was curated by Carlos Buil & Ricardo Marco, and sponsored by the Caja Rural de Aragon Foundation.

Bibliography
Felix Anaut's work has been recorded in many publications, catalogues and books including:

 “Melodias Vascas”, BBK & Ikeder, Bilbao, Spain, 2012
 “Felix Anaut”, Barnard Gallery, Cape Town, 2011
 "Felix Anaut, His life & Work" by Michael Simonow, 2010
 "Zaragoza Symphony - Felix Anaut", Cajalón, Zaragoza, Spain, 2011
 "Genius Loci" College of Architects of Aragon, Cajalon and Zaragoza City Council, Zaragoza, Spain, 2009
 "No Hay Camino, Se Hace Camino Al Andar - Felix Anaut", France, 2006
 "100 Artists for a Museum" Casoria Contemporary Art Museum, Naples, Italy, 2005
 "NU" Centre d’Art Contemporain Raymond Farbos, Mont de Marsan, France, 2005
 "Los Artistas, Picasso, Miró, Bacon, Anaut", ARTTANK, Belfast, Northern Ireland, 2000
 "Drawings, Paintings and Sculpture, the Catalogue", Ulster Museum, Belfast, 2000

References

External links
 Felix Anaut, main website
 James Wray Gallery, Belfast
 Barnard Gallery, Cape Town, South Africa
 Zimmer Stewart Gallery, Arundel
 The Simonow Collection, France
 The Ulster Museum, Belfast
 Instituto Cervantes
 Contemporary Art Centre CAM in Mont de Marsan, France

Spanish artists
Abstract painters
Abstract expressionist artists
Living people
1944 births